Table Plus is a club for men aged between 40 and 60 that provides a selection of social and community service related opportunities for its members. It was created in Canterbury, and is a member of the Association of Ex-Round Tablers' Clubs.

Logo

The Table Plus logo was designed as an adaptation of the Canterbury Cross.

History

The founder chairman, Martin Neame, had recently retired from Canterbury & District Round Table and felt a need existed for a club with a similar ethos and raison d'être to that existing in Canterbury & District Round Table, but with a younger look and feel than Canterbury 41 Club. Together with several colleagues (also recently "retired") he set up the organisation's first club (Canterbury Table Plus No 1). The formation of the club was also based on a desire to stem the loss of members from the Round Table family of Clubs.

The name "Table Plus" was selected to be sufficiently similar to "Round Table" but yet distinctive. Since its members are drawn from Ex-Tablers, it has a very similar feel. In general, it is supportive to its feeder table and will assist in many ways when called upon to do so.

The club received its Charter from The Association of Ex-Round Tablers' Clubs in 2008 and is proud to be counted as part of that organisation.

Within a couple of years the fledgling club has visited several international Round Table gatherings and sown the seeds of interest in countries such as the Netherlands, Belgium, Germany, Norway, Sweden, Denmark and Austria.

Activities

The focal point of Table Plus is its regular meetings. It is these meetings and discussions that allow the lasting bonds of friendship that were formed during time in Round Table to continue to grow. Activities are frequently outdoors and challenging, often finishing with an evening meal or BBQ. Speakers for indoor events are often invited to enable those in the audience broadening their minds and cultural awareness.

Table Plus does not exist in order to raise money for charity. It is often involved, however, with local projects and charitable organisations in order to discharge some civic duty.

External links

International 41 Club Websites
The National Association of Ex-Round Tablers' Clubs UK
National Association of Ex Tablers Clubs Denmark

Individual Table Plus Websites
Canterbury Table Plus No. 1 UK

References

   
   

Clubs and societies in England